The Atlantic 10 Conference Men's Soccer Freshman of the Year award is an annual award given to the top freshman soccer player in the Atlantic 10 Conference. The award was first given out in 1987.

Key

Winners

Freshman of the Year (1987–present)

References 

College soccer trophies and awards in the United States
Newcomer of the Year
Awards established in 1987
College sports freshman awards
Atlantic 10
1987 establishments in the United States